Ash Hill is an ghost town in San Bernardino County, in the U.S. state of California. Afton, Amboy, Bagdad, Cadiz, Cadiz Summit, Lavic, Glasgow and Kelso are the nearby communities. Ash Hill is named for Southern Pacific surveyor Benjamin Ash whom died in the area from dehydration, it is also possible it could be named for the surrounding dark brown and grey hills. Ash Hill is a part of a chain of ghost towns in San Bernardino County along Interstate 40 and Route 66, the area includes Daggett, Lavic, Klondike, Argos and Ludlow.

References

Unincorporated communities in California
Unincorporated communities in San Bernardino County, California